Glendale, Arizona, held an election for mayor on August 28, 2012. It saw the election of Jerry Weiers.

Results

References 

2012
Glendale
Glendale